The Pentacle Club is one of the world's oldest magic societies well known by amateur and professional magicians for its longevity and famous members.

Origins
The Pentacle Club was founded in 1919 by Professor W. W. Rouse Ball, J. H. Johnson, C. R. Cosens, F. J. W. Roughton, and W. I. Grantham. The Club, consisting of members of the University of Cambridge, was a successor to The Mystics, a pre-World War II club that ran from 1909 to 1914. Rouse Ball, the first President of the club, gathered support from across the university for the first meeting of the club, where the members "saw demonstrations of rope and card tricks, thimble and billiard ball manipulations". The initial subscription rate was half a crown a term.

Later history
During the 1920s, the Pentacle Club became increasingly well known on a national level, thanks in part to a sequence of guest visits to Cambridge, including Douglas Dexter and Nevil Maskelyne, the latter inviting the Pentacle Club to undertake a joint performance with the Magic Circle in London. During the Second World War, the club performed in aid of the Red Cross, with amateur magicians from the University of London, evacuated to Cambridge during the conflict, adding to the membership. In 1963 the club began to admit members from outside the university, leading to a slow change in the club's composition — over the last few decades the membership has been increasingly drawn from the Cambridge region, and less from undergraduates. The club retained its traditional links to the university, however, under the long presidency of Sir William Hawthorne, Master of Churchill College, Cambridge, well known for performing magic.

Present

Past Presidents 
Presidents and their tenures:
 1919 – 1925 Professor W. W. Rouse Ball
 1925 – 1932 Doctor J. Canney
 1932 – 1968 Doctor F.B. Kipping
 1969 – 1969 Sir Gordon Sutherland
 1970 – 1990 Sir William Hawthorne
 1990 – 2008 Claude Perry MIMC
 2008 – 2013 John Davenport MIMC
 2013 – 2018 Chris Kostecki MMC

References

Magic clubs
University of Cambridge